The Commission scolaire du Val-des-Cerfs was a francophone school district in the Canadian province of Quebec. It comprised several primary schools and high schools across twenty-nine municipalities in the Montérégie region. The commission was overseen by a board of elected school trustees. It was the result of the 1998 reforms in education which led to the fusion of the school districts Des Cantons, Des Rivières and Davignon.

Schools
In September 2014, Commission scolaire du Val-des-Cerfs covered 46 schools.

Elementary schools (35)
 École de L'Assomption, (Granby)
 École Ave Maria, (Granby)
 École Centrale, (Saint-Joachim-de-Shefford)
 École Curé-A.-Petit, (Cowansville)
 École de la Chantignole, (Bromont)
 École de la Clé-des-Champs, (Dunham)
 École de la Moisson-d'Or, (Saint-Alphonse-de-Granby)
 École de l'Étincelle, (Granby)
 École de l'Orée-des-Cantons, (Waterloo)
 École des Bâtisseurs (Granby)
 École du Phénix, (Granby)
 École du Premier-Envol, (Bedford)
 École Eurêka, (Granby)
 École Joseph-Poitevin, (Granby)
 École Mgr-Desranleau, (Bedford)
 École Mgr-Douville, (Farnham)
 École Notre-Dame-de-Lourdes, (Saint-Armand)
 École Roxton Pond, (Roxton Pond)
 École Saint-André, (Granby)
 École Saint-Bernard, (Granby)
 École Saint-Édouard, (Lac-Brome)
 École Saint-François-d'Assise, (Frelighsburg)
 École Saint-Jacques, (Farnham)
 École Saint-Jean, (Granby)
 École Saint-Joseph, (Granby)
 École Saint-Joseph, (Notre-Dame-de-Stanbridge)
 École Saint-Léon, (Cowansville)
 École Saint-Romuald, (Farnham)
 École Saint-Vincent-Ferrier, (Bromont)
 École Sainte-Cécile, (Sainte-Cécile-de-Milton)
 École Sainte-Famille, (Granby)
 École Sainte-Thérèse, (Cowansville)
 École Sutton, (Sutton)

High schools (7)
 École de la Haute-Ville, (Granby)
 École Jean-Jacques-Bertrand, (Farnham)
 École Joseph-Hermas-Leclerc, (Granby)
 École L'Envolée, (Granby)
 École Massey-Vanier, (Cowansville)
 École Mgr-Desranleau, (Bedford)
 École Wilfrid-Léger, (Waterloo)
 École Secondaire du Verbe Divin, (Granby)

School for adults (2)
 Campus de Brome-Missisquoi (CBM), (Cowansville). Used to be known as Centre d'éducation des adultes et de formation professionnelle, renamed in 2008 during its expansion.
 Centre régional intégré de formation (CRIF), (Granby). Inaugurated in 1967.

References

External links
Commission scolaire du Val-des-Cerfs

Historical school districts in Quebec
Education in Montérégie
1988 establishments in Canada